The Galveston–Houston Electric Railway was an interurban railway between Galveston and Houston, Texas from 1911 to 1936. The railway was recognized as the fastest interurban line in 1925 and 1926.

Route

The track roughly followed the current path of Interstate 45 (Gulf Freeway), and is now used as a utility right of way for high tension power lines. The Galveston Bay causeway was considered a great feat of engineering and cost about US$2 million (US$ in ) to build in the late 1910s.

While most of the original stations have been demolished to make room for new structures, several artifacts remain. Minute Maid Park was built from Union Station, and features a railway theme. Before Interstate 45, a small, two-story interurban station was located on College Avenue where it crossed Airport Boulevard. This crossing was not at right angles but like an "X" and would be located slightly east of I-45 on the feeder street, if it still existed today. Airport Blvd becomes College Ave in South Houston at I-45. The original causeway in Galveston can be easily seen to the east from the interstate highway causeway.

Other stops included Park Place, City of South Houston (formerly City of Dumont), College Ave/Airport Blvd at Interstate 45, Clear Creek Crossing (the power station), and the Galveston Terminal on 21st Street, between Church and Post Office streets.

Future
There has been recent talk of re-establishing some form of train service between Houston and Galveston. Several test trips have been made using Amtrak equipment under the Gulfliner name. It has been suggested that some parts of the old Interurban right of way might be used to bypass congested sections of track on the host railroad.

References

External links
 Houston Streetcar History Pages
Galveston Island Railroad Museum
Railroads - Key to Galveston

Defunct Texas railroads
Interurban railways in Texas
Transportation in Houston
Transportation in Galveston County, Texas
History of Galveston, Texas
History of Houston
Railway lines opened in 1911
1936 disestablishments in Texas
Greater Houston
Galveston Bay Area
Railway lines closed in 1936
1911 establishments in Texas